Alice the Toreador is a 1925 animated short film by Walt Disney in the Alice Comedies series. As of January 1, 2021, this film has fallen into the public domain in the United States.

Plot 

Alice and Julius play bullfighters, selecting a peaceful old steer as their "bull". However, when Terrible Tom swaps the steer with a legitimate bull, Alice is forced to run for her life. Alice and Julius trap the bull in a pen, and Julius takes on the role of the bull. However, their ruse is soon revealed when a dog pulls the bull skin off of Julius, and the crowd reacts angrily to the deception.

References

External links 

 
 Alice the Toreador at The Encyclopedia of Disney Animated Shorts

1925 short films
1920s sports comedy films
Films directed by Walt Disney
Alice Comedies
American sports comedy films
1920s Disney animated short films
1925 animated films
American black-and-white films
American silent short films
Animated films about cats
Bullfighting films
1925 comedy films
Animated films without speech
American animated short films
Films about cattle
Silent American comedy films
Silent sports comedy films